Twinfilin-1 is a protein that in humans is encoded by the TWF1 gene.
This gene encodes twinfilin, an actin monomer-binding protein conserved from yeast to mammals. Studies of the mouse counterpart suggest that this protein may be an actin monomer-binding protein, and its localization to cortical G-actin-rich structures may be regulated by the small GTPase RAC1.

Model organisms
				
Model organisms have been used in the study of TWF1 function. A conditional knockout mouse line, called Twf1tm1a(EUCOMM)Wtsi was generated as part of the International Knockout Mouse Consortium program — a high-throughput mutagenesis project to generate and distribute animal models of disease to interested scientists — at the Wellcome Trust Sanger Institute.

Male and female animals underwent a standardized phenotypic screen to determine the effects of deletion. Twenty three tests were carried out on mutant mice, but no significant abnormalities were observed.

References

Further reading

Genes mutated in mice